Gaëtan Henri Alfred Edouard Léon Marie Gatian de Clérambault (2 July 1872 – 17 November 1934) was a French psychiatrist.

Career 
De Clérambault gained his thesis in 1899, later becoming an assistant physician at the special infirmary for the insane, Prefecture de Police (1905). From 1920 onward, he was head of this institution.

Apart from his psychiatric studies, he was an acclaimed painter and wrote on the costumes of various native tribes. He was also a professional photographer, from 1914 to 1918 he took around 30,000 photographs, some of the photos taken as part of a research project involving symptoms of hysteria. Many of his photos were later placed in the Musée de l'Homme. For a period of time, Clérambault conducted classes on the art of draped costumes at the École nationale supérieure des Beaux-Arts in Paris.

For his actions during World War I, de Clérambault was awarded with a cross of the Légion d'Honneur as well as the Croix de Guerre.

He committed suicide by firearm on 17 November 1934 in Malakoff, a commune southwest of Paris. Famously, the French psychoanalyst Jacques Lacan attributed his 'entry into psychoanalysis' as largely due to the influence of de Clérambault, whom he regarded as his 'only master in psychiatry'. Eugène Minkowski and Henri Ey were also deeply influenced by Clérambault's work in psychiatry. In 1942, one of his former pupils, Jean Fretet, published two volumes of Clérambault's works with the title "Oeuvre Psychiatrique". Clérambault's life and art are depicted in the film "Cry of Silk" (1996).

He is credited with introducing the term "psychological (mental) automatism", proposing that the mechanism of mental automatism could be blamed for hallucinatory experiences. He divided mental automatisms into three types: associative, motor and sensitive. He considered the mental automatism to be the primary process of psychosis while the delusional state was to be regarded as secondary. Clérambault is also credited with describing and cataloguing individual automatisms — there are considered to be around eighty distinct automatisms.

Associated syndromes
 de Clérambault's syndrome; (also called erotomania) a condition in which a person becomes deluded that a certain person of higher social status is in love with them. It was described by Clérambault in a treatise titled "Les psychoses passionelles" (1921).
 Kandinsky-Clérambault syndrome; a confusing clinical entity in which the patient believes his mind is being controlled by someone else or external forces. Named along with Russian physician Victor Khrisanfovich Kandinsky (1849–1889).

Publications (selection) 
 Contribution à l'étude de l'othématome (pathogénie, anatomie pathologique et traitement). Thèse Paris, 1899.
 Contribution à l'étude de la folie communiquée et simultanée, 1903.
 Syndrome mécanique et conception mécanisiste des psychoses hallucinatoires. Annales médico-psychologiques, Paris, 1927, 85: 398–413.
 L'Automatisme mental par De Clérambault; Département psychiatrique Théraplix, 1942 (with Jean Fretet).
 Oeuvre psychiatrique. Paris, PUF, 1942 (2 vols.). Facs.ed.: Oeuvres psychiatriques. Paris, Frénésie, 1987, 
 Passion érotique des étoffes chez la femme, Montreuil-sous-bois, Les empêcheurs de penser en rond, 1991.
 "Mental automatisms. A conceptual journey into psychosis". Translation and commentaries [by Paul Hriso] on the works of Gaëtan Gatian de Clérambault.  [Bayonne, N.J.], Hermes Whispers Press, 2002. .

References

External links 
    
 Mental Automatisms, A conceptual journey into Psychosis Catalogue of Automatisms.

1872 births
1934 suicides
French psychiatrists
French photographers
People from Bourges
Suicides by firearm in France
1934 deaths